Francis Beny Nzaba (born 17 July 2002) is a Congolese professional footballer who plays as a centre-back for Erovnuli Liga club Dinamo Tbilisi, on loan from Süper Lig club İstanbul Başakşehir.

Professional career
Nzaba began his senior career with the Diables Noirs in the 2021-22 season making 4 appearances in the CAF Confederation Cup that season. He transferred to the Turkish club İstanbul Başakşehir on 9 May 2022 on a three-year contract. He made his professional debut with Başakşehir as a late substitute in a 2–0 Süper Lig win over Antalyaspor on 27 December 2022.

On 24 January 2023, Nzaba was loaned by Dinamo Tbilisi in Georgia until the end of 2023.

International career
Nzaba made his international debut with the Congo national team in a friendly 2–1 loss to Sierra Leone on 29 March 2022.

Honours
Diables Noirs
 Coupe du Congo: 2021–22

References

External links
 
 
 

2002 births
Living people
Republic of the Congo footballers
Republic of the Congo international footballers
CSMD Diables Noirs players
İstanbul Başakşehir F.K. players
FC Dinamo Tbilisi players
Botola players
Süper Lig players
Association football defenders
Republic of the Congo expatriate footballers
Republic of the Congo expatriate sportspeople in Turkey
Expatriate footballers in Turkey
Republic of the Congo expatriate sportspeople in Georgia (country)
Expatriate footballers in Georgia (country)